Roland Schaack (born 7 July 1973) is a retired Luxembourgian football defender and later manager.

References

1973 births
Living people
Luxembourgian footballers
Jeunesse Esch players
US Rumelange players
Association football defenders
Luxembourg under-21 international footballers
Luxembourg international footballers
Luxembourgian football managers
FC Differdange 03 managers